Major General Ian Gordon Gill,  (9 November 1919 – 23 November 2006) was a British Army officer who fought with distinction during the Second World War, later serving as Assistant Chief of the General Staff from 1970 to 1972.

Military career
Educated at Repton School, Gill was commissioned into the 4th/7th Royal Dragoon Guards in 1938 and fought in World War II at the Dunkirk evacuation and in the Normandy landings and then in North West Europe. After the war he served in Palestine during the Palestine Emergency and in 1957 became Commanding Officer of 4th/7th Royal Dragoon Guards. He was made commander of Victory College at the Royal Military Academy Sandhurst in 1961 and commander of the 7th Armoured Brigade in 1964. He went on to be Deputy Military Secretary in 1966, Head of the British Defence Liaison Staff in Canberra in 1968 and Assistant Chief of the General Staff (Operational Requirements) in 1970 before retiring in 1972.

In retirement, he lived at Thorney in Cambridgeshire and became Director of the Thorney Abbey Restoration Fund.

Family
In 1963 he married Elizabeth Vivian (Sally) Rohr, a consultant neurologist; they had no children.

References

External links
British Army Officers 1939−1945

|-

1919 births
2006 deaths
4th/7th Royal Dragoon Guards officers
Academics of the Royal Military Academy Sandhurst
Graduates of the Royal College of Defence Studies
British Army major generals
British Army personnel of World War II
British military personnel of the Palestine Emergency
Companions of the Order of the Bath
Graduates of the Royal Military College, Sandhurst
Graduates of the Staff College, Camberley
Officers of the Order of the British Empire
People educated at Repton School
People from Rochester, Kent
Recipients of the Military Cross
Military personnel from Kent